Viviane Santana Lyra (born 29 July 1993) is a Brazilian racewalker. She competed in the women's 20 kilometres walk event at the 2019 World Athletics Championships held in Doha, Qatar. She did not finish her race. She also competed in the same event at the 2022 World Athletics Championships held in Eugene, Oregon, United States.

In 2019, she competed in the women's 50 kilometres walk event at the Pan American Games held in Lima, Peru. She finished in 4th place with a personal best of 4:22:46.

In 2022, she broke the Brazilian record of 35 km twice, once in April, with a time of 2:49:12, and another at the 2022 World Athletics Championships, with the mark of 2:45:02, where she finished in 8th place.

Personal bests
Her best times are:

Road walk
35 km: 2:45:02 –  Eugene, 22 Jul 2022 (Brazilian record)
50 km: 4:22:46 –  Lima, 11 Aug 2019 (Brazilian record)

References

External links 
 

Living people
1993 births
Place of birth missing (living people)
Brazilian female racewalkers
World Athletics Championships athletes for Brazil
Pan American Games athletes for Brazil
Athletes (track and field) at the 2019 Pan American Games
South American Games silver medalists for Brazil
South American Games medalists in athletics
Athletes (track and field) at the 2022 South American Games
21st-century Brazilian women